Clay County is a county in the U.S. state of Mississippi. As of the 2020 census, the population was 18,636. Its county seat is West Point. Its name is in honor of American statesman Henry Clay, member of the United States Senate from Kentucky and United States Secretary of State in the 19th century. J. Wesley Caradine, an African American, was the first state representative for Clay County after it was established in 1871.

The federal government formerly designated Clay County as the West Point Micropolitan Statistical Area, but the county lost that status in 2013.  It is part of the Golden Triangle region of the state.

Geography

Major highways
  U.S. Highway Alternate 45
  Mississippi Highway 25
  Mississippi Highway 46
  Mississippi Highway 47
  Mississippi Highway 50

Adjacent counties
 Chickasaw County (north)
 Monroe County (northeast)
 Lowndes County (southeast)
 Oktibbeha County (south)
 Webster County (west)

National protected area
 Natchez Trace Parkway (part)

Demographics

2020 census

As of the 2020 United States Census, there were 18,636 people, 7,618 households, and 4,841 families residing in the county.

2010 census
As of the 2010 United States Census, there were 20,634 people living in the county. 58.2% were Black or African American, 40.5% White, 0.2% Asian, 0.1% Native American, 0.3% of some other race and 0.6% of two or more races. 1.0% were Hispanic or Latino (of any race).

2000 census
As of the census of 2000, there were 21,979 people, 8,152 households, and 5,885 families living in the county.  The population density was 54 people per square mile (21/km2).  There were 8,810 housing units at an average density of 22 per square mile (8/km2).  The racial makeup of the county was 56.33% Black or African American, 42.82% White, 0.05% Native American, 0.16% Asian, 0.01% Pacific Islander, 0.21% from other races, and 0.42% from two or more races.  0.86% of the population were Hispanic or Latino of any race.

According to the census of 2000, the largest ancestry groups in Clay County were African 56.3%, English 35% and Scots-Irish 4.5%.

There were 8,152 households, out of which 35.70% had children under the age of 18 living with them, 45.80% were married couples living together, 22.40% had a female householder with no husband present, and 27.80% were non-families. 25.50% of all households were made up of individuals, and 11.00% had someone living alone who was 65 years of age or older.  The average household size was 2.64 and the average family size was 3.19.

In the county, the population was spread out, with 28.80% under the age of 18, 10.40% from 18 to 24, 26.50% from 25 to 44, 21.10% from 45 to 64, and 13.10% who were 65 years of age or older.  The median age was 34 years. For every 100 females there were 89.10 males.  For every 100 females age 18 and over, there were 83.60 males.

The median income for a household in the county was $27,372, and the median income for a family was $35,461. Males had a median income of $30,038 versus $19,473 for females. The per capita income for the county was $14,512.  About 19.20% of families and 23.50% of the population were below the poverty line, including 34.20% of those under age 18 and 21.90% of those age 65 or over.

Education
Clay County is within the service area of the East Mississippi Community College system.

Public schools
 West Point Consolidated School District and West Point High School are in the county.

Communities

Cities
 West Point (county seat)

Census-designated place
 Pheba

Unincorporated communities

 Abbott
 Cedarbluff
 Hopewell
 Montpelier
 Tibbee
 Una
 Waverly
 White Station

Ghost town
 Palo Alto

Politics

See also

 National Register of Historic Places listings in Clay County, Mississippi

References

 
Mississippi counties
Counties of Appalachia
1871 establishments in Mississippi
Populated places established in 1871
Black Belt (U.S. region)
Majority-minority counties in Mississippi